Cemil Aksu is a Turkish Armenian political and social activist, journalist and ecologist. Also he is a chief editor of the Hamshetsu Gor journal on Culture and History of Hemshin people and Peoples' Democratic Party local co-chairman. He is one of the critics of Turkish Government led by Recep Tayyip Erdoğan.

Life and career 
Aksu was born in Hopa city in Artvin Province, Turkey, in Hamshen Armenian family.

He was arrested in 1996 for political reasons. In 2004 after getting out of the jail Aksu had entered to Anadolu University Public Administration Faculty. He had his master's degree in philosophy in Istanbul Bilgi University.

In 2008-2011 was editor of Hamshenian Biryaşam journal on history, identity, nature and political state of Hopa.

In November 2017 after his publications in social networks Aksu was arrested for «glorifying a crime and criminals» by Turkish police in Ardvin city. Before that, in 24 October 2017, his wife, human rights activist and a member of the Socialist Party of the Oppressed (ESP) Nurcan Vayiç Aksu, was arrested. In 8 December 2017, after several weeks in prison, Cemil Aksu and his wife were released from prison.

Family 
Aksu is married with Nurcan Vayiç Aksu, they have one son (Arev).

Publications 
Aksu is an author of several books, including:
 Cemil Aksu // Karadeniz'in Sol Köşesi: Hopa // Ugur Biryol, Communications Publications, 2012
 Cemil Aksu, Meryem Özçep // Kimlikler, Çıkarlar, Siyasetler: Karadeniz Siyasetine Hopa'dan Bakmak

References

External links 
 
 Aksu's interview for the Kolektifi ecological journal

1977 births
People from Hopa
Living people
Anadolu University alumni
Istanbul Bilgi University alumni
Turkish human rights activists
Turkish non-fiction writers
Turkish journalists
Ecologists
Turkish escapees
Turkish people of Armenian descent
Turkish people of Hemshin descent
Escapees from Turkish detention
Ethnic Armenian journalists
Peoples' Democratic Party (Turkey) politicians
Politicians arrested in Turkey